Derry Championship may refer to:
Derry Senior Football Championship
Derry Minor Football Championship
Derry Senior Hurling Championship

See also
Derry club football competitions
Derry club hurling competitions
Derry GAA